Gail Susan Ricketson (born September 12, 1953) is an American rower who competed in the 1976 Summer Olympics.

She was born in Plattsburgh, New York.

In 1976 she was a crew member of the American boat which won the bronze medal in the eights event.

References

External links 
 

1953 births
Living people
American female rowers
Rowers at the 1976 Summer Olympics
Olympic bronze medalists for the United States in rowing
Medalists at the 1976 Summer Olympics
21st-century American women